The longue durée is the French Annales School approach to the study of history. It gives priority to long-term historical structures over what François Simiand called histoire événementielle ("evental history", the short-term time-scale that is the domain of the chronicler and the journalist).  It concentrates instead on all-but-permanent or slowly evolving structures, and replaces elite biographies with the broader syntheses of prosopography. The crux of the idea is to examine extended periods of time and draw conclusions from historical trends and patterns.

Approach
The longue durée is part of a tripartite system that includes short-term événements and medium-term conjunctures (periods of decades or centuries when more profound cultural changes such as the industrial revolution can take place).

The approach, which incorporates social scientific methods such as the recently evolved field of economic history into general history, was pioneered by Marc Bloch and Lucien Febvre in the Interwar period. The approach was carried on by Fernand Braudel, who published his views after becoming the editor of Annales in 1956. In the second part of the century, Braudel took stock of the current status of social studies in crisis, foundering under the weight of their own successes, in an article in 1958, "Histoire et sciences sociales: La longue durée". Among the works which Braudel remarked on as examples of the longue durée was Alphonse Dupront's study of the long-standing idea in Western Europe of a crusade, which extended across diverse European societies far beyond the last days of the actual crusades, and among spheres of thought with a long life he noted Aristotelian science. In the longue durée of economic history, beyond, or beneath, the cycles and structural crises, lie "old attitudes of thought and action, resistant frameworks dying hard, at times against all logic." Braudel also stressed the importance of slow-changing geographic factors, like the constraints placed by the natural environment upon human production and communication. In the first volume of The Mediterranean and the Mediterranean World in the Age of Philip II, for example, he described the tension between mountain dwellers and plain dwellers, with their different cultures and economic models, as a basic feature of Mediterranean history over thousands of years.

The history of the longue durée that informs Braudel's two masterworks therefore offers a contrast to the archives-directed history that arose at the end of the 19th century, and a return to the broader views of the earlier generation of Jules Michelet, Leopold von Ranke, Jacob Burckhardt or Numa Denis Fustel de Coulanges.

Averil Cameron, in examining the Mediterranean world in late antiquity concluded that "consideration of the longue durée is more helpful than the appeal to immediate causal factors." Sergio Villalobos also expressly took the long view in his Historia del pueblo chileno.

Jean-François Bayart extended the concept to Africa. The systems of inequality and domination inherent in pre-colonial African societies have their own historical dynamics. Consequently, postcolonial national constructions cannot be understood from the sole point of view of their relations with the Western powers and their position in the world economy, Bayart argued. African states must therefore be analyzed in their historicity, which implies analyzing the power relations within contemporary African societies - in particular the role played by the dominant class in its societies, so as to update all the parameters. that influence the present and the future of these States, he posited.

See also

 Cliodynamics
 Macrohistory
 World-systems theory
 David Nirenberg § Anti-Judaism: The Western Tradition

Notes

Sources and further reading

  Fernand Braudel and Sarah Matthews, On History, The University of Chicago Press, 1982, 
 Robert D. Putnam with Robert Leonardi and Raffaella Y. Nanetti, Making Democracy Work: Civic Traditions in Modern Italy, Princeton University Press, 1993, 
 Debating the long durée, a special section in Annales. Histoire, Sciences Sociales – English Edition,  ISSN: 2398-5682 (Print), 2268–3763 (Online)

Theories of history